Elections to Kilmarnock and Loudoun District Council were held on 1 May 1980, on the same day as the other Scottish local government elections. This was the third election to the district council following the local government reforms in the 1970s.

The election was the last to use the original 16 wards created by the Formation Electoral Arrangements in 1974. Each ward elected one councillor using first-past-the-post voting. Following the Initial Statutory Reviews of Electoral Arrangements in 1981, several wards were changed or abolished and the number of wards was increased.

Labour gained overall control of the district council after winning 11 of the 16 seats as the party increased their vote share by nearly 20% and took more than half of the popular vote. The previous election in 1977 had resulted in no overall control after Labour and the Conservatives were tied with seven seats each. The Conservatives were the second-largest party after they retained five of their seven seats. The Scottish National Party (SNP), who had won two seats in 1977, lost both of their seats.

Background
Supported by the two SNP councillors, the Conservatives had run Kilmarnock and Loudon as a minority since the previous election in 1977 while, at Westminster, the party had taken over from Labour following the 1979 general election.

Ahead of the 1980 election, the Conservatives campaigned to continue on with their "winning team". Their manifesto was entitled "Passport to Prosperity" and highlighted their support for the Right to Buy policy, a pledge to build new swimming baths and their support for small businesses at the newly established industrial estate in Bonnyton.

Labour's campaign focused on the Thatcher government at Westminster which was unpopular in Scotland with their election literature headed "Tory Rule Not OK". They pledged to modernise the council's housing stock, provide leisure facilities for the whole family and introduce a more creative job opportunity scheme in response to raising unemployment.

The SNP campaigned on a perceived "criminal" wasting of money within local government claiming that while rents and rates had increased dramatically since the local government reforms in 1974, ratepayers were instead funding "pleasure trips" for councillors in relation to town twinning.

Results

Source:

Ward results

Ward 1

Ward 2

Ward 3

Ward 4

Ward 5

Ward 6

Ward 7

Ward 8

Ward 9

Ward 10

Ward 11

Ward 12

Ward 13

Ward 14

Ward 15

Ward 16

Aftermath
Labour regained control of the district council from the minority Conservative administration which had been in power since the previous election in 1977. Cllr Andrew Nisbet was elected as Provost following the first meeting of the new council.

The result reflected a "strong anti-Tory trend" across Scotland according to Conservative group leader Cllr Alan MacDougal while former SNP councillor Leslie Flannigan blamed the Thatcher government for the party's losses as they were caught "in the middle of a shift from Tory to Labour".

By-elections

Ward 9
Ward 9 Labour councillor Maisie Garven died on 16 November 1980 and a by-election, held on 12 February 1981, was won by Labour's Robert Stirling.

Ward 2
Labour group leader and Ward 2 councillor Robert Creighton died suddenly on 18 August 1982 and a by-election, held on 11 November, was won by Labour's James Campbell.

References

1980 Scottish local elections
1980